Møre og Romsdal is one of the 19 multi-member constituencies of the Storting, the national legislature of Norway. The constituency was established as Møre in 1921 following the introduction of proportional representation for elections to the Storting. It was renamed Møre og Romsdal from 1935. It is conterminous with the county of Møre og Romsdal. The constituency currently elects seven of the 169 members of the Storting using the open party-list proportional representation electoral system. At the 2021 parliamentary election it had 192,394 registered electors.

Electoral system
Møre og Romsdal currently elects seven of the 169 members of the Storting using the open party-list proportional representation electoral system. Constituency seats are allocated by the County Electoral Committee using the Modified Sainte-Laguë method. Compensatory seats (seats at large) are calculated based on the national vote and are allocated by the National Electoral Committee using the Modified Sainte-Laguë method at the constituency level (one for each constituency). Only parties that reach the 4% national threshold compete for compensatory seats.

Election results

Summary

(Excludes compensatory seats. Figures in italics represent joint lists.)

Detailed

2020s

2021
Results of the 2021 parliamentary election held on 13 September 2021:

The following candidates were elected:
Åse Kristin Ask Bakke (Ap); Birgit Oline Kjerstad (SV); Per Vidar Kjølmoen (Ap); Jenny Klinge (Sp); Geir Inge Lien (Sp); Sylvi Listhaug (FrP); Helge Orten (H); and Frank Edvard Sve (FrP).

2010s

2017
Results of the 2017 parliamentary election held on 11 September 2017:

The following candidates were elected:
Fredric Holen Bjørdal (Ap); Jon Georg Dale (FrP); Jenny Klinge (Sp); Sylvi Listhaug (FrP); Else-May Norderhus (Ap); Helge Orten (H); Steinar Reiten (KrF); Vetle Wang Soleim (H); and Marianne Synnes (H).

2013
Results of the 2013 parliamentary election held on 8 and 9 September 2013:

The following candidates were elected:
Fredric Holen Bjørdal (Ap); Rigmor Andersen Eide (KrF); Pål Farstad (V); Oskar Jarle Grimstad (FrP); Jenny Klinge (Sp); Harald T. Nesvik (FrP); Else-May Norderhus (Ap); Elisabeth Røbekk Nørve (H); and Helge Orten (H).

2000s

2009
Results of the 2009 parliamentary election held on 13 and 14 September 2009:

The following candidates were elected:
Rigmor Andersen Eide (KrF); Svein Gjelseth (Ap); Oskar Jarle Grimstad (FrP); Mette Hanekamhaug (FrP); Jenny Klinge (Sp); Harald T. Nesvik (FrP); Else-May Norderhus (Ap); Elisabeth Røbekk Nørve (H); and Tove-Lise Torve (Ap).

2005
Results of the 2005 parliamentary election held on 11 and 12 September 2005:

The following candidates were elected:
Karita Bekkemellem (Ap); May-Helen Molvær Grimstad (KrF); Bjørn Jacobsen (SV); Leif Helge Kongshaug (V); Asmund Kristoffersen (Ap); Petter Løvik (H); Harald T. Nesvik (FrP); Eli Sollied Øveraas (Sp); and Lodve Solholm (FrP).

2001
Results of the 2001 parliamentary election held on 9 and 10 September 2001:

The following candidates were elected:
Karita Bekkemellem (Ap); Kjell Magne Bondevik (KrF); May-Helen Molvær Grimstad (KrF); Bjørn Jacobsen (SV); Asmund Kristoffersen (Ap); Petter Løvik (H); Harald T. Nesvik (FrP); Elisabeth Røbekk Nørve (H); Eli Sollied Øveraas (Sp); and Lodve Solholm (FrP).

1990s

1997
Results of the 1997 parliamentary election held on 15 September 1997:

The following candidates were elected:
Karita Bekkemellem (Ap); Kjell Magne Bondevik (KrF); May-Helen Molvær Grimstad (KrF); Laila Kaland (Ap); Leif Helge Kongshaug (V); Asmund Kristoffersen (Ap); Petter Løvik (H); Harald T. Nesvik (FrP); Gudmund Restad (Sp); and Lodve Solholm (FrP).

1993
Results of the 1993 parliamentary election held on 12 and 13 September 1993:

The following candidates were elected:
Karita Bekkemellem (Ap); Kjell Magne Bondevik (KrF); May-Helen Molvær Grimstad (KrF); Jørgen Holte (Sp); Laila Kaland (Ap); Ottar Kaldhol (Ap); Asmund Kristoffersen (Ap); Eli Sollied Øveraas (Sp); Gudmund Restad (Sp); and Anders Talleraas (H).

1980s

1989
Results of the 1989 parliamentary election held on 10 and 11 September 1989:

The following candidates were elected:
Karita Bekkemellem (Ap); Kjell Magne Bondevik (KrF); Laila Kaland (Ap); Rikard Olsvik (Ap); Gudmund Restad (Sp); Per Rolf Sævik (KrF); Lodve Solholm (FrP); Ingvard Sverdrup (H); Anders Talleraas (H); and Marie Lovise Widnes (SV).

1985
Results of the 1985 parliamentary election held on 8 and 9 September 1985:

The following candidates were elected:
Arve Berg (Ap); Kjell Magne Bondevik (KrF); Mary Eide (Ap); Kjell Furnes (KrF); Laila Kaland (Ap); Inger Koppernæs (H); Rikard Olsvik (Ap); Gudmund Restad (Sp); Ingvard Sverdrup (H); and Anders Talleraas (H).

1981
Results of the 1981 parliamentary election held on 13 and 14 September 1981:

The following candidates were elected:
Arve Berg (Ap); Kjell Magne Bondevik (KrF); Mary Eide (Ap); Aslaug Fredriksen (KrF); Inger Koppernæs (H); Oddbjørn Sverre Langlo (H); Rikard Olsvik (Ap); Hans Hammond Rossbach (V); Anders Talleraas (H); and Arnold Weiberg-Aurdal (Sp).

1970s

1977
Results of the 1977 parliamentary election held on 11 and 12 September 1977:

The following candidates were elected:
Arve Berg (Ap); Kjell Magne Bondevik (KrF); Mary Eide (Ap); Aslaug Fredriksen (KrF); Asbjørn Jordahl (Ap); Oddbjørn Sverre Langlo (H); Hans Hammond Rossbach (V); Anders Talleraas (H); Odd Vigestad (KrF); and Arnold Weiberg-Aurdal (Sp).

1973
Results of the 1973 parliamentary election held on 9 and 10 September 1973:

The following candidates were elected:
Arve Berg (Ap); Kjell Magne Bondevik (KrF); Alv Jakob Fostervoll (Ap); Arnt Gudleik Hagen (Sp); Oddbjørn Sverre Langlo (H); Ola Langset (SV); Hans Hammond Rossbach (V); Kåre Stokkeland (Ap); Odd Vigestad (KrF); and Arnold Weiberg-Aurdal (Sp).

1960s

1969
Results of the 1969 parliamentary election held on 7 and 8 September 1969:

The following candidates were elected:
Bjarne Flem (V); Alv Jakob Fostervoll (Ap); Arnt Gudleik Hagen (Sp); Peter Kjeldseth Moe (Ap); Sverre Bernhard Nybø (H); Hans Hammond Rossbach (V); Arne Sæter (KrF); Kåre Stokkeland (Ap); Odd Vigestad (KrF); and Arnold Weiberg-Aurdal (Sp).

1965
Results of the 1965 parliamentary election held on 12 and 13 September 1965:

The following candidates were elected:
Bjarne Flem (V); Ola Johan Gjengedal (KrF); Arnt Gudleik Hagen (Sp); Olav Rasmussen Langeland (Sp); Peter Kjeldseth Moe (Ap); Sverre Bernhard Nybø (H); Hans Hammond Rossbach (V); Anders Sæterøy (Ap); Kåre Stokkeland (Ap); and Knut Toven (KrF).

1961
Results of the 1961 parliamentary election held on 11 September 1961:

The following candidates were elected:
Ivar Kornelius Eikrem (Ap), 34,121 votes; Einar Hareide (KrF), 20,841 votes; Olav Rasmussen Langeland (Sp), 13,339 votes; Kristian Langlo (V), 15,851 votes; Peter Kjeldseth Moe (Ap), 34,121 votes; Claus Marius Neergaard (Ap), 34,107 votes; Sverre Bernhard Nybø (H), 9,342 votes; Anders Sæterøy (Ap), 34,124 votes; Sivert Todal (V), 15,845 votes; and Knut Toven (KrF), 20,842 votes.

1950s

1957
Results of the 1957 parliamentary election held on 7 October 1957:

The following candidates were elected:
Ivar Kornelius Eikrem (Ap); Bjarne Fjærtoft (V); Einar Hareide (KrF); Olav Rasmussen Langeland (Bp); Peter Kjeldseth Moe (Ap); Sverre Bernhard Nybø (H); Ulrik Olsen (Ap); Anders Sæterøy (Ap); Sivert Todal (V); and Knut Toven (KrF).

1953
Results of the 1953 parliamentary election held on 12 October 1953:

The following candidates were elected:
Anton Ludvig Alvestad (Ap); Ivar Kornelius Eikrem (Ap); Bjarne Fjærtoft (V); Einar Hareide (KrF); Olav Rasmussen Langeland (Bp); Sverre Bernhard Nybø (H); Ulrik Olsen (Ap); Anders Sæterøy (Ap); Knut Olaf Andreasson Strand (V); and Knut Toven (KrF).

1940s

1949
Results of the 1949 parliamentary election held on 10 October 1949:

The following candidates were elected:
Peder Alsvik (Ap); Haldor Bjerkeseth (KrF); Einar Hareide (KrF); Olav Oksvik (Ap); Knut Olaf Andreasson Strand (V); Knut Toven (KrF); and Trygve Utheim (V).

1945
Results of the 1945 parliamentary election held on 8 October 1945:

The following candidates were elected:
Peder Alsvik (Ap); Einar Hareide (KrF); Olav Oksvik (Ap); Hans Ingvald Hansen Ratvik (V); Sverre Reiten (KrF); Lars Sverkeson Romundstad (Bp); and Trygve Utheim (V).

1930s

1936
Results of the 1936 parliamentary election held on 19 October 1936:

As the list alliance were not entitled to more seats contesting as alliances than they were contesting as individual parties, the distribution of seats was as party votes.

The following candidates were elected:
Peder Alsvik (Ap); Ola Olson Dønheim (V); Rasmus Olsen Langeland (Bp); Olav Oksvik (Ap); Lars Sverkeson Romundstad (Bp); Knut Olaf Andreasson Strand (V); and Peter Ørger Pedersen Syltebø (V).

1933
Results of the 1933 parliamentary election held on 16 October 1933:

As the list alliances were entitled to more seats contesting as alliances than they were contesting as individual parties, the distribution of seats was as list alliance votes. The Bp-FS list alliance's additional seat was allocated to the Farmers' Party.

The following candidates were elected:
Ole Rasmus Knutsen Flem (V); Rasmus Olsen Langeland (Bp); Olav Oksvik (Ap); Lars Sverkeson Romundstad (Bp); Johan Martin Jakobsen Strand (V); Peter Ørger Pedersen Syltebø (V); and Nils Trædal (Bp).

1930
Results of the 1930 parliamentary election held on 20 October 1930:

The following candidates were elected:
Olav Eysteinson Fjærli (V); Ole Rasmus Knutsen Flem (V); Rasmus Olsen Langeland (Bp); Olav Oksvik (Ap); Lars Sverkeson Romundstad (Bp); Johan Martin Jakobsen Strand (V); and Ole N. Strømme (V).

1920s

1927
Results of the 1927 parliamentary election held on 17 October 1927:

The following candidates were elected:
Olav Eysteinson Fjærli (V); Ole Rasmus Knutsen Flem (V); Rasmus Olsen Langeland (Bp); Olav Oksvik (Ap); Lars Sverkeson Romundstad (Bp); Johan Martin Jakobsen Strand (V); and Anders Vassbotn (V).

1924
Results of the 1924 parliamentary election held on 21 October 1924:

The following candidates were elected:
Olav Eysteinson Fjærli (V); Ole Rasmus Knutsen Flem (V); Kristoffer Høgset (Bp); Rasmus Olsen Langeland (Bp); Johan Martin Jakobsen Strand (V); Anders Vassbotn (V); and Bastian Adolf Width (H-FV).

1921
Results of the 1921 parliamentary election held on 24 October 1921:

The following candidates were elected:
Olav Eysteinson Fjærli (V); Ole Rasmus Knutsen Flem (V); Kristoffer Høgset (L); Rasmus Olsen Langeland (L); Rasmus Martinus Sivertsen Moltu (V); Jakob Larsen Mork (V); and Anders Vassbotn (V).

Notes

References

Storting constituency
Storting constituencies
Storting constituencies established in 1921